Abraham Mateo Chamorro (born 25 August 1998), is a Spanish singer, songwriter, actor, and record producer. He is known for his soulful and dance-oriented music.

Mateo was only seven when he began winning prizes on television shows and at the age of nine, he was awarded the Revelation Prize at Spain's national music contest for kids. For over three years, Mateo starred as a regular on children's TV show , where he stood out for his strong vocal abilities and stage presence. Around age ten, he signed a recording contract with EMI Music Spain and released a debut self-titled album, Abraham Mateo.

He returned four years later with his second album, AM, on Sony Music Spain. The album showcased Mateo's growth as a performer and found him incorporating electronic and dance elements into his sound. With the single "Señorita", he made his breakthrough in the music scene, achieving a great success in Spain and Latin America.  "Señorita" stayed in the Spain's Top 50 single charts for almost a year and its music video was the most trending music video of 2013 in YouTube Spain. In 2014 Mateo released his third studio album, Who I AM, which peaked at number one in Mexico and Spain. A fourth album, Are You Ready?, followed a year later, showcasing his own songwriting skills and a more mature style. Mateo's albums have received one Platinum and three Gold certifications in Spain. In 2017, he released "Loco Enamorado", an urban pop song featuring Farruko that marks Mateo's comeback to the spotlight. "Loco Enamorado" entered Billboard charts, Spotify's Global Top 50, and has been multi-Platinum certified in US, Spain and Latin America. Recently, he released "Háblame Bajito" with 50 Cent and Austin Mahone and "Se Acabó El Amor" with Yandel and Jennifer Lopez.

From 2014 onwards, Mateo has embarked on three concert tours across Spain and Latin America, delivering over 80 live shows altogether. Being so young, he sold out countless shows at major venues and arenas such as the National Auditorium in Mexico City, the Luna Park Stadium in Buenos Aires, the Caupolicán Theatre in Santiago de Chile, and the Sports Centre in Madrid. He was the opening act for the British boyband One Direction in Peru, Chile and Spain as part of their 2014's Where We Are Tour. Mateo has performed on the European Spanish soundtrack of several computer-animated movies and series including Frozen and Minions. He has appeared in small roles and cameos in TV movies and series broadcast in Spain and Portugal.

Mateo is a producer who not only produces for himself but also for other outstanding artists such as Ivy Queen, Gente de Zona, Belinda, Samo, Juan Magán, Sofía Reyes, Austin Mahone, Jennifer Lopez, 50 Cent, Drake Bell, Becky G, Lali, Manuel Turizo, Agustín Casanova y Lérica. He has collaborated with numerous other artists, including Farruko, Jennifer Lopez, Yandel, Luis Fonsi, Sofia Reyes, Becky G, Manuel Turizo, Pitbull, 50 Cent, Austin Mahone, CNCO, Leslie Grace, Gabriela Sepúlveda, Ha*Ash, Lali Espósito, Carlos Rivera, Río Roma, CD9, Dvicio, Alejandro Sanz and Malú. Mateo has co-written many of his own hits with notable musicians such as Claudia Brant, Damon Sharpe, Poo Bear, Lindy Robbins, Lauren Christy, Eric Sanicola, Jacobo Calderón, Descemer Bueno, Mónica Vélez, The Jackie Boyz, Mario Domm, Jörgen Elofsson, Andre Merritt, Aris Archontis, José Luis Roma, John Reid and Talay Riley.

He has received four nominations for the Premios Juventud awards, presented by the American Spanish-language television network Univisión. In 2015, Billboard named him to their "21 Under 21s Next Class" list of "music's hottest young stars", and also placed him on their Top 10 young Latin acts list Mateo is the youngest solo male artist to lead the Billboard's Latin Airplay chart.

Beginnings
Abraham Mateo was born on 25 August 1998 in San Fernando, Cádiz, the younger child of Antonio Mateo, a construction worker and security guard, and Susana Chamorro, a housewife. He has an older brother, Tony, who also sings and plays music. Mateo was born into a family with musical roots; his maternal grandfather was a tenor soloist with a church choir, his paternal grandfather was a flamenco singer, and his mother sings Boleros and Spanish music. He started singing at the age of three by imitating the performances of the TV talent show Operación Triunfo. Mateo's first vocal coach was his mother Susana and he later continued his music education by attending singing lessons. He learned to play flute at age six, piano and keyboard at age eight, and acoustic guitar at age ten, teaching himself how to play by ear.

In 2006, at the age of seven, he was awarded with a special mention at the regional music competition for kids in Andalusia, organized by the Teresa Rabal Foundation. Two years later, he won the revelation award at the national competition.
In 2008, he debuted in the children's television show "Menuda Noche" that airs on the  Canal Sur TV of Andalusia. For over four years, Mateo starred as a regular in "Menuda Noche", where he performed songs by Nino Bravo, Rocío Dúrcal, Alejandro Sanz, David Bisbal, Miguel Gallardo, Sandro Giacobbe, David Bustamante, Melody and other Latin artists.

Music career

2009–10: Debut album Abraham Mateo

Early 2009, around age ten, he signed a recording contract with EMI Music Spain, releasing in December of the same year his self-titled debut album, Abraham Mateo. The album, recorded in Madrid, includes original ballads written by his producer Jacobo Calderon, covers of songs by Raphael, Alejandro Sanz, Laura Pausini, and Luis Fonsi, as well as a  duet with the French singer Caroline Costa.

In 2009, he also debuted as actor in the TV miniseries Días Sin Luz, which recounts the search for the missing girl Mari Luz Cortes. Mateo played the younger brother of Mari Luz in the miniseries broadcast by Antena 3 in Spain. A year later, he portrayed Falín, the young Raphael, in the Antena 3 miniseries based on the life of the legendary Spanish singer.

After the release of his debut album, he continued covering songs in Spanish, Italian, and English (including a duet with Sabrina Carpenter) and then uploading the videos to YouTube. In November 2011, Mateo released "Desde que te fuiste", a Latin dance song written by himself, on ITunes.

2012–13: AM
In 2012 he signed to Sony Music Spain and to Rosa Lagarrigue, long-time manager of Alejandro Sanz, Miguel Bosé and Mecano.

A year later, he delivered his sophomore studio album AM. The album was recorded in Madrid and Miami and marked a turn in his music towards pop and electropop, dance elements, and Spanglish lyrics. AM debuted at number six on the Spain's albums chart, was listed for 52 weeks and certified Gold by Promusicae.

He rose to popularity with the release of AMs first single, "Señorita". The song, written by Herbie Crichlow and Thomas Troelsen, was listed for 40 weeks on the Spain's Top 50 singles chart, peaked on number three, and was certified Gold in Spain. The music video for "Señorita" was the most trending music video of 2013 on YouTube Spain. By April 2013, Mateo was ranked at number 3 on the Billboard'''s Next Big Sound chart. In July, he performed "Señorita" at the 2013 Premios Juventud Awards in Miami, where he was nominated as "Best New Artist".

The album's second single, "Girlfriend", written by Charlie Mason, was released early October 2013 and debuted within the top fifteen in Spain.  The third single, "Lánzalo", written by Jacobo Calderón and Mateo himself, was released in March 2014 as a charity single, in support of UNICEF campaign for the children who suffer as a result of the Syrian conflict. The song debuted at number two on the Spain's Top 50 singles chart.

The AM tour started in February 2014 in Valencia and, after almost 40 concerts around Spain, ended in September 2014 in Málaga. In October 2014, Mateo headlined the "Coca-Cola Music Experience" concert at a sold-out 15,000-seat Sports Palace, in Madrid.

In November 2014, he gave his first concerts in Latin America: at Sala Omnium, in Santiago, Chile and at a sold-out 7,000-seat Luna Park arena, in Buenos Aires, Argentina.

He was the opening act for the British boyband One Direction in Peru, Chile and Spain as part of their 2014's Where We Are Tour.

Mateo performed "La puerta hacia el amor" (English: "Love Is An Open Door") for the European Spanish soundtrack of 2013 Disney's film Frozen. He starred in the online series XQEsperar, which also featured Angy Fernandez.

2014–15: Who I Am
 In May 2014, he traveled to Los Angeles to work on his third studio album with Damon Sharpe, Lauren Christy, Andre Merritt and other songwriters. The album, titled Who I AM and released in Spain and Latin America in November 2014, is a collection of broken beats, throwback funk vibes, futuristic beats and organic arrangements.  A special edition of the album followed in June 2015, featuring guest appearances by Dvicio, Critika & Saik and Lerica. Who I AM peaked at number one in Mexico and  Spain and was certified Platinum by Promusicae.

In September 2014, he released the first single "All The Girls (La La La)", a song written by Lauren Christy, Jacobo Calderón and Mateo himself, which peaked at number 9 on the Spain's singles chart and topped the radio charts in Brazil. The music video for this song was chosen as the best Spanish music video of 2014 on the VEVO platform. The album also included the singles "Todo Terminó" and "Another Heartbreak" featuring Dvicio's vocalist Andrés Ceballos.

To promote Who I AM, he embarked on a tour to Colombia, Chile, Brazil, Argentina, Dominican Republic and Mexico. In this last country, Mateo performed with Carlos Rivera at Teatro Metropólitan and with the Mexican boyband CD9 at Mexico City Arena. The Who I AM concert tour began in December 2014 in Barcelona and ended after nine months and almost 40 shows, including a big concert at Sports Palace, in Madrid. He held his first solo concerts in Mexico City, at Plaza Condesa, and Peru, and his second sold-out concert at legendary Luna Park arena, in Buenos Aires.

He appeared as a special guest in Alejandro Sanz's concert at the Sports Palace in Málaga. Mateo also performed at TVE's New Year's Eve show in a duet with Spanish pop star Malu.

Mateo was featured in Lodovica Comello' single "Sin usar palabras", from her album Mariposa. He collaborated with CD9 on their single "Para Siempre". He wrote "Eres Ese Milagro" and "Recordando El Beso" for the Spanish trio Lérica.

He composed and interpreted the soundtrack of the animated series Invizimals, produced by BRB International, and based on a PlayStation video game.

In November 2014, Mateo's first biography, I.AM. was published by Montena, an editorial part of Penguin Random House.

In January 2015 he received the "Premio a la identidad isleña" (Islander Identity Prize), which was awarded by the city hall of San Fernando, Cádiz, his birthplace.

2015–16: Are You Ready?
 In March 2015, he traveled to London and Los Angeles to write songs for a new album in collaboration with Poo Bear, Damon Sharpe, Jörgen Elofsson, Lindy Robbins, Talay Riley and Julian Emery. A year later, Mateo delivered his fourth studio album, Are You Ready?, which debuted at number 3 in Spain and at number 7 in Mexico. The album showcases Mateo's songwriting skills and stands out with its mixture of British pop vibe, reggae touches, R&B and mature lyrics. Included on the album were the singles "Old School", "Are You Ready", "Así Es Tu Amor", "When You Love Somebody", "Mi Vecina", and "Mueve", featuring Argentinian singer Lali.

To promote Are You Ready?, Mateo traveled to  Colombia, Chile, Portugal, Argentina, Peru and Mexico. In October 2016, he held his most important concert so far at a sold-out 10,000-seat National Auditorium in Mexico City, featuring guest appearances by CNCO, Dulce María, Mau & Ricky, and Rio Roma.

Mateo was featured on the ballad version of chart-topping single "Quisiera", from CNCO's debut album, Primera Cita. He wrote "Malas Lenguas" for Gemeliers' album Gracias and "Rumbera" for Spanish trio Lérica.

Mateo received three nominations at the 2016 ,2017,2019:Premios Juventud awards where he also took to the stage as presenter.

In 2015, he performed the single "Mellow Yellow" by Donovan for the Spanish soundtrack of the Universal Pictures animated film, Minions. A year later, he made a cameo performance in the Portuguese teenage series Massa fresca, broadcast by Televisão Independente (TVI).

2017-18: A Cámara Lenta
In 2017, with a view to the internationalization of his musical project, Mateo took on Armando Lozano (Ricky Martin and CNCO's former manager) and Edgar Andino (long-time manager of Wisin y Yandel) as new managers.

In June, he released his new single "Loco Enamorado" featuring Puerto Ricans Farruko and Christian Daniel. "Loco Enamorado", written by Mateo himself and Edgar Barrera and produced by renowned urban music producer Jumbo, peaked on Billboards 'Latin Pop Songs' at number six, and also entered Billboard's Hot Latin Songs, Latin Airplay, Latin Rhythm Airplay, Mexico Airplay and Latin Digital Song Sales. The single is now certified three times Platinum in Chile, two times Platinum in Spain, Platinum in Mexico and Gold in USA, Argentina and Peru.

In December 2017, he released a second single called "Háblame Bajito" featuring rap legend 50 Cent and pop singer Austin Mahone. The music video for the song exclusively premiered on Billboard's website. "Háblame Bajito" peaked at number 17 on the Billboard's Latin Digital Songs chart and is now certified Gold in Spain, Argentina and US Latin

In March 2018, he released a third single called "Se Acabó El Amor" with Jennifer Lopez and Yandel.

Mateo is featured on Pitbull's single "Jungle" along with The Stereotypes and E-40. This collaboration will be included on Pitbull's first Greatest Hits album.

He was also featured on Ha*Ash's song "30 de Febrero", included in the album of the same name.

In January 2018, Mateo appeared, along with Puerto Rican urban singer Lary Over, on Farruko and Jacob Forever's remix of "Quiereme".

2019-Present
In January 2023, he was confirmed as one of the presenters of the new RTVE musical talent called Cover night, along with Ana Guerra and Ruth Lorenzo.

Artistry

Mateo's music is mainly pop, while he also incorporates elements of R&B, electropop, reggae and upbeat Latin music.

Leila Cobo of Billboard describes Mateo as a "wunderkind" that "sounds and dances a lot like Michael Jackson".

In an interview for Billboard, Mateo cited Michael Jackson as his biggest musical inspiration. He has also listed Bruno Mars, Chris Brown, Justin Timberlake, Jason Derulo, Alejandro Fernández, Ricky Martin, Luis Miguel, Camila and Alejandro Sanz, among his main influences.

Discography

Studio albums

Singles

Notes

Featured singles

Guest appearances

Music videos
 As lead artist

 As featured artist

Concert toursHeadliningAM (2014) (Spain, Chile, and Argentina)
Who I AM (2014–15) (Spain, Mexico, Argentina, and Peru)
Are You Ready (2015–16) (Spain, Mexico, Argentina, Chile and Ecuador)Opening act'''
Where We Are Tour  (2014)

Production discography

Filmography

Television

Film

Awards and nominations

iHeartRadio Music Awards

|-
| 2018 || Himself || Best New Latin Artist||  
|}

Premios Juventud

|-
| 2013 || Himself || Artist Revelation ||  
|-
|rowspan="3"| 2016 || Himself || Voice of the Moment||  
|-
| Himself || My Pop/Rock Artist|| 
|-
| "Así Es Tu Amor" || Heart-Wrenching Song||  
|}

Nickelodeon Kids' Choice Awards

|-
| 2014 || Himself || Best Spanish Artist ||  
|-
| 2017 || Himself || Best Spanish Artist ||  
|}

Nickelodeon Mexico Kids' Choice Awards

|-
| 2016 || Himself || Favorite International Artist ||  
|}

Radio Disney Music Awards

|-
| 2016 || Himself || Best Spanish Artist ||  
|}

References

Further reading

External links

  – official site
 
 

1998 births
Living people
People from San Fernando, Cádiz
Child pop musicians
Internet memes
Latin pop singers
Singers from Andalusia
Sony Music Publishing artists
Sony BMG artists
Sony Music Spain artists
Spanish pop singers
Spanish child singers
Spanish male television actors
Spanish male child actors
English-language singers from Spain
Italian-language singers
Spanish YouTubers
21st-century Spanish singers
21st-century Spanish male singers
Sony Music Latin artists